"Things Aren't Funny Anymore" is a song written and recorded by American country music artist Merle Haggard and The Strangers.  It was released in February 1974 as the first single from the album Merle Haggard Presents His 30th Album.  The song was Merle Haggard and The Strangers seventeenth number one on the country charts.  The single stayed at number one for a single week and spent ten weeks on the country chart.

Chart performance

References
 

Merle Haggard songs
1974 singles
Songs written by Merle Haggard
Song recordings produced by Ken Nelson (American record producer)
Capitol Records singles
1974 songs